Vincent is a city in Webster County, Iowa, United States. The population was 130 at the time of the 2020 census.

Geography
Vincent is located at  (42.592224, -94.019457).

Demographics

2010 census
As of the census of 2010, there were 174 people, 73 households, and 47 families living in the city. The racial makeup of the city was 94.3% White, 0.6% Asian, 2.9% from other races, and 2.3% from two or more races. Hispanic or Latino of any race were 6.3% of the population.

There were 73 households, of which 28.8% had children under the age of 18 living with them, 54.8% were married couples living together, 5.5% had a female householder with no husband present, 4.1% had a male householder with no wife present, and 35.6% were non-families. 28.8% of all households were made up of individuals, and 9.6% had someone living alone who was 65 years of age or older. The average household size was 2.38 and the average family size was 2.94.

The median age in the city was 40 years. 23% of residents were under the age of 18; 13.3% were between the ages of 18 and 24; 22.4% were from 25 to 44; 26.4% were from 45 to 64; and 14.9% were 65 years of age or older. The gender makeup of the city was 54.6% male and 45.4% female.

2000 census
As of the census of 2000, there were 158 people, 67 households, and 46 families living in the city. The racial makeup of the city was 100.00% White.

There were 67 households, out of which 31.3% had children under the age of 18 living with them, 65.7% were married couples living together, 3.0% had a female householder with no husband present, and 29.9% were non-families. 29.9% of all households were made up of individuals, and 11.9% had someone living alone who was 65 years of age or older. The average household size was 2.36 and the average family size was 2.91.

In the city, the population was spread out, with 24.7% under the age of 18, 5.1% from 18 to 24, 25.3% from 25 to 44, 29.7% from 45 to 64, and 15.2% who were 65 years of age or older. The median age was 40 years. For every 100 females, there were 105.2 males. For every 100 females age 18 and over, there were 101.7 males.

The median income for a household in the city was $32,500, and the median income for a family was $46,250. Males had a median income of $32,143 versus $21,250 for females. The per capita income for the city was $16,341. About 4.8% of families and 6.2% of the population were below the poverty line, including 5.0% of those under the age of eighteen and none of those 65 or over.

Education
The Eagle Grove Community School District serves children from PreK to 12th grade. The district covers area of Wright, Humboldt, and Webster counties, and serves the communities of Eagle Grove, Thor, Vincent, Woolstock, and the surrounding rural areas.

References

External links

 
City-Data Comprehensive Statistical Data and more about Vincent

Cities in Webster County, Iowa
Cities in Iowa